The New Zealand Long and Efficient Service Medal was the earliest medal awarded in New Zealand for long and efficient services, being issued between 1 January 1887 to 22 September 1931.  Eligibility for the medal changed over time (see infobox) and, from 1920, could be issued to all members of the New Zealand Military Forces for 16 or 20 years of service (active service between 5 August 1914 and 28 January 1919 counted as double qualifying time).

Description
The medal is round, 37 mm in diameter, and made of silver.  The obverse of the medal depicts a Royal Crown superimposed over a crossed sword and Taiaha (Maori long club) and surrounded by fern fronds. The reverse bears the inscription FOR LONG AND EFFICIENT SERVICE. The medal's suspension is a 14 mm diameter ring, which passes through a loop fixed to the top of the piece. The ring will move forwards and backwards.   The medal is suspended from a ribbon 38 mm wide, crimson in colour with two central white stripes, which were added in 1917.

Varieties
There are three varieties:

The first variety was manufactured by S. Kohn, Wellington, and marked S. KOHN between the ends of the ribbon bow.
The second variety was manufactured by G.T. White, Christchurch and Wellington, and is found either unmarked, or marked with G.T. WHITE between the ends of the ribbon bow.
The third variety was manufactured by William Dibble, Gerrards, London in the early 1950s. These medals were cast frosted silver second type medals, with very small suspension rings, sterling silver hallmarks and WJD on the bottom of the reverse. Intended primarily as replacement medals, most were sold to collectors with SPECIMEN impressed on the rim.

See also
 Orders, decorations, and medals of New Zealand
 List of military decorations
 David Cossgrove

Notes

Military awards and decorations of New Zealand
New Zealand Meritorious & Long Service Awards
Awards established in 1887
Long and Meritorious Service Medals of Britain and the Commonwealth